Kang Jin-wook (born 13 February 1986) is a South Korean footballer who currently plays for UiTM FC in Liga Perdana.

His previous club was Gwangju Sangmu at K-League in South Korea, and his youth club is FC Metz in France.

Club career statistics 
As of end of 2015 season

References

External links

 

1986 births
Living people
Association football defenders
South Korean footballers
South Korean expatriate footballers
FC Metz players
Jeju United FC players
Gimcheon Sangmu FC players
Ulsan Hyundai FC players
Seongnam FC players
Ligue 1 players
K League 1 players
Expatriate footballers in France
South Korean expatriate sportspeople in France